General Sir Miles Nightingall KCB (25 December 1768 – 12 September 1829) was a British Army officer. He sat in the House of Commons as a Tory from 1820 to 1829.

Military career
Nightingall entered the army in 1787. He served in India and in England with Lord Cornwallis and was at Puerto Rico with Ralph Abercromby in 1797 and at the San Domingo with Thomas Maitland in December 1797. He arranged the evacuation of Port-au-Prince. He commanded the 4th Battalion in Ireland during Cornwallis' Viceroyalty, and was on the staff when the latter went as Ambassador-Extraordinary to France in 1802. He was also Military Secretary during Cornwallis' Viceroyalty in India.

In the mid-1800s he was stationed in the British penal colony of New South Wales, where he commanded the 73rd Regiment. In 1809 he declined an offer to become Governor,. Instead in 1811 he took command of the 1st Division in the Anglo-Portuguese Army in the Peninsular War before going again to India, where he was the Commander-in-chief of the Bombay Army from 24 February 1816 to 9 October 1819. He returned to England in 1819 and was elected at the 1820 general election as a Member of Parliament (MP) for Eye,
and held the seat until his death in 1829, aged 60.

References

 

|-

|-

Commanders-in-chief of Bombay
Tory MPs (pre-1834)
Members of the Parliament of the United Kingdom for English constituencies
UK MPs 1820–1826
UK MPs 1826–1830
1768 births
1829 deaths
Knights Commander of the Order of the Bath
British Army commanders of the Napoleonic Wars
British Army generals
73rd Regiment of Foot officers
British Army personnel of the Peninsular War
British Army personnel of the French Revolutionary Wars
Burials at Gloucester Cathedral